Thelaxes is a genus of true bugs belonging to the family Aphididae.

The species of this genus are found in Europe.

Species:
 Thelaxes californica (Davidson, 1919) 
 Thelaxes dryophila (Schrank, 1801

References

Aphididae